The Espace 800 (English: Space) is a French sailboat that was designed by Philippe Briand as a cruising motorsailer and first built in 1981. The boat is part of the Espace series of cruising sailboats and its designation indicates its length overall in centimeters.

Production
The design was built by Jeanneau in France, from 1981 to 1984, but it is now out of production.

Design
The Espace 800 is a recreational keelboat, built predominantly of fiberglass. It has a fractional sloop rig, with a single set of spreaders and aluminum spars with stainless steel wire rigging. The mainsheet is rigged to a cockpit arch. The hull has a raked stem, a reverse transom, an internally mounted spade-type rudder controlled by a wheel and a fixed stub keel with a retractable centerboard. It displaces  and carries  of ballast.

The boat is fitted with an inboard engine for docking and maneuvering.

The design has sleeping accommodation for five people, with a double "V"-berth in the bow cabin, an "L"-shaped settee and a straight settee in the main cabin. The galley is located on the port side amidships. The galley is equipped with a two-burner stove and a sink. The head is located just aft of the bow cabin on the starboard side and includes a shower.

See also
List of sailing boat types

References

External links

Keelboats
Motorsailers
1980s sailboat type designs
Sailing yachts
Sailboat type designs by Philippe Briand
Sailboat types built by Jeanneau